M110A2 may refer to:

M110 howitzer, an American-made self-propelled artillery system
M110A2 SASS, an upgraded variant of the M110 Semi-Automatic Sniper System